Game store may refer to:

 A place where recreational games are stored
 Game larder: a building where game carcasses are stored
 A Video game retailer
 A hobby shop
 Game, a South African store which is a subsidiary of Massmart
 Game (retailer), a major British video game retailer

See also
 Club (organization)